The 2010 All-Ireland Senior Camogie Championship Final was the 79th All-Ireland Final and the deciding match of the 2010 All-Ireland Senior Camogie Championship, an inter-county camogie tournament for the top teams in Ireland.

Wexford led 1-8 to 0-4 at half-time but Galway nearly staged a comeback, an injury time goal by Aisling Connolly narrowing the gap to two points at the end.

References

All
All-Ireland Senior Camogie Championship Finals
All-Ireland Senior Camogie Championship Final
All-Ireland Senior Camogie Championship Final, 2010